In the U.S. military, the term REDCON is short for Readiness Condition and is used to refer to a unit's readiness to respond to and engage in combat operations. There are five REDCON levels, as described below in this excerpt from Army Field Manual 71–1.

Overview
 REDCON-1: Full alert; unit ready to move and fight.
 WMD alarms and hot loop equipment stowed; OPs pulled in. (A hot loop is a field telephone circuit between the subunits of a company.)
 All personnel alert and mounted on vehicles; weapons manned.
 Engines started.
 Company team is ready to move immediately.
 REDCON-1.5
 WMD alarms and hot loop equipment stowed; OPs pulled in.
 All personnel alert and mounted on vehicles; weapons manned.
 Company team is ready to move immediately.
 REDCON-2: Full alert; unit ready to fight.
 Equipment stowed (except hot loop and WMD alarms).
 Precombat checks complete.
 All personnel alert and mounted in vehicles; weapons manned & charged, round in chamber, weapon on safe.
 (NOTE: Depending on the tactical situation and orders from the commander, dismounted OPs may remain in place.)
 All (100 percent) digital and FM communications links operational.
 Status reports submitted in accordance with task force SOP.
 Company team is ready to move within 15 minutes of notification.
 REDCON-3: Reduced alert.
 Fifty percent of the unit executes work and rest plans.
 Remainder of the unit executes security plan. Based on the commander's guidance and the enemy situation, some personnel executing the security plan may execute portions of the work plan.
 Company team is ready to move within 30 minutes of notification.
 REDCON-4: Minimum alert.
 OPs manned; one soldier per platoon designated to monitor radio and man turret weapons.
 Digital and FM links with task force and other company teams maintained.
 Company team is ready to move within one hour of notification.

See also

 Alert state
 DEFCON
 Force Protection Condition
 Redcon (2016 game)

References

External links 
 REDCON levels from Army Field Manual 71-1 on GlobalSecurity.org

Alert measurement systems
Military life
Military terminology of the United States